Frankie Fontaine (born October 1, 1988), better known by the stage name Young Kidd or YK the Mayor, is a Canadian rapper of aboriginal and Jamaican heritage. He began performing in 2005 and has released multiple mixtapes, two albums and was nominated for two APCMA awards in 2010. Fontaine has been successful in the Winnipeg rap scene.

Early life
Fontaine was born in Winnipeg, Manitoba. He attended Tec Voc High School. He began rapping in 2004 through a program called Mike Check. Fontaine is of both Aboriginal and Jamaican descent. His mother is originally from Sagkeeng First Nation.

Discography

Mixtapes
The Beginning (2006)
Hustlaz Mentality (2007) 
April Showers (2010)
  The February Tape (2010)Loyalty (2010)Wonderful Winnipeg (2011)

AlbumsI Go Hard (2009)10x10 (2010)Criminals Turned Legit (2011) with Lotto, Quick Cash, Boogey the Beat & LJ MontanaLiberation'' (2019) YK The Mayor

Legal issues
In 2008, Fontaine was forced to pay a $1200 fine and receive one year of probation after he was convicted of possessing a firearm. In May 2009, Fontaine was sentenced to 3 years for shooting into the ceiling of a sports bar.

References 

1988 births
Canadian male rappers
Living people
Musicians from Winnipeg
21st-century Canadian rappers
21st-century Canadian male musicians